Carlos Gilberto Nascimento Silva or simply Gil (born 12 June 1987 in Rio de Janeiro) is a Brazilian professional footballer who plays as a centre back for  Corinthians.

International career
On 19 August 2014, Gil was called up to play for the Brazil national team against Colombia and Ecuador by new manager Dunga His debut took place during the match against Ecuador, which Brazil won 1-0.

Gil played at the 2014 edition of the Superclásico de las Américas, where Brazil defeated Argentina 2-0. He was placed in the standby list for the 2015 Copa América.

Gil had a controversially disallowed goal, in which he was ruled to have fouled an opposition player before heading into the net, in a FIFA World Cup qualifier away to Paraguay, in March 2016. The match ended 2-2. Later that year, he was called up to the 23-man squad which would compete at the Copa América Centenario.

In June 2017, Gil was recalled to the national team, now coached by Tite, who included the defender on his list for the first time. He made his return to the national team after nearly a full year in the Superclásico de las Américas, which ended in a 0-1 defeat to Argentina.

Career statistics

Club

International

Honours

Club
Jaguaré
 Copa Espírito Santo: 2007

Atlético Goianiense
 Campeonato Brasileiro Série C: 2008

Cruzeiro
 Campeonato Mineiro: 2009

Corinthians
 Campeonato Paulista: 2013
 Recopa Sudamericana: 2013
 Campeonato Brasileiro Série A: 2015

International
Brazil
 Superclásico de las Américas: 2014

Individual
 Campeonato Brasileiro Série A Team of the Year: 2014, 2015
 Campeonato Paulista Team of the Year: 2015

References

External links
 Official Cruzeiro's profile

1987 births
Living people
Brazilian footballers
Brazilian expatriate footballers
Americano Futebol Clube players
Associação Jaguaré Esporte Clube players
Atlético Clube Goianiense players
Cruzeiro Esporte Clube players
Valenciennes FC players
Campeonato Brasileiro Série A players
Campeonato Brasileiro Série B players
Campeonato Brasileiro Série C players
Ligue 1 players
Expatriate footballers in France
People from Campos dos Goytacazes
Brazil international footballers
Sport Club Corinthians Paulista players
Shandong Taishan F.C. players
Chinese Super League players
Expatriate footballers in China
Brazilian expatriate sportspeople in China
Copa América Centenario players
Association football defenders
Sportspeople from Rio de Janeiro (state)